Loch Achnamoine is a small mountain loch, situated on the River Helmsdale in the Highland council area of Scotland. The nearest settlement to it is Kinbrace, a small village 2.5 miles (4 km) east, along a small country road.

The name derives from the Scottish Gaelic elements "achadh" and "mòine", meaning "Lake of the Peat-field".

Loch Achnamoine is a drift dam, formed from the last glacial period in Scotland. The loch was the site of several biological surveys in the 1990s, identifying several species of xanthidium in its waters

References 

Achnamoine